= John Harada =

John J. Harada is an American biologist, focusing in genomic, molecular, genetic, and biochemical, dissection of embryogenesis and seed development in plants, currently at University of California, Davis and an Elected Fellow of the American Association for the Advancement of Science and American Society of Plant Biology.
